Francisco Garrido Patrón (born 1953) is a Mexican politician who was Governor of Querétaro from 2003 to 2010, and member of the National Action Party (PAN). Previously, he was mayor of Querétaro City from 1 October 1997 to 30 September 2000.
Under his government he constructed the “Acueducto II” which is the main source of water for Querétaro city, the “Centro de Congresos” of Querétaro, and the “Circuito Universidades”.

See also
List of Queretan governors
List of current Mexican governors
 List of presidents of Querétaro Municipality

References

External links
 Biography of Francisco Garrido Patrón at PAN website 

1953 births
Living people
20th-century Mexican politicians
21st-century Mexican politicians
Governors of Querétaro
Members of the Chamber of Deputies (Mexico)
Municipal presidents of Querétaro
National Action Party (Mexico) politicians
People from Mexico City
People from Querétaro